Altos de San Luis, also known as Monte Altos de San Luis (Spanish for San Luis heights), is an 886 feet (270 m) high and two-mile-long prominent mountain ridge located on the northern edge of the Caguas Valley, in barrio (district) Bairoa of Caguas, Puerto Rico. The ridge is bordered by the Loíza River to the north and the east, and it forms part of a larger system of mountain ridges that extends from the southwestern end of the Sierra de Luquillo in Gurabo to the northeastern end of the Cordillera Central in Aguas Buenas. Other mountains and hills along this system include the Altos de La Mesa and Cerro La Marquesa. These ridges are shaped by the Great Northern Puerto Rico fault zone (GNPRfz), an active fault zone which crosses the island diagonally from southeast to northwest.

The forested area on the mountain ridge, known as Finca Longo, is protected by the municipality of Caguas as a critical habitat of the Puerto Rican plain pigeon (Patagioenas inornata wetmorei), locally known as the paloma sabanera, which until the 1970s was on the brink of extinction. This pigeon has been observed to nest, roost and feed on the habitat created by the secondary forest found here.

See also 
 Geology of Puerto Rico
 Altos de La Mesa
 Cordillera Central
 Sierra de Luquillo

References 

Mountains of Puerto Rico
Caguas, Puerto Rico